Akiko Furu (born 18 July 1973) is a Japanese trampoline gymnast. She competed in the women's trampoline event at the 2000 Summer Olympics held in Sydney, Australia. She finished in 6th place.

In 2001, she competed in the women's synchronized trampoline event at the 2001 World Games held in Akita, Japan.

References

External links 
 

Living people
1973 births
Place of birth missing (living people)
Japanese female trampolinists
Olympic gymnasts of Japan
Gymnasts at the 2000 Summer Olympics
Competitors at the 2001 World Games
21st-century Japanese women